The Scobey–Coronach Border Crossing connects the towns of Scobey, Montana and Coronach, Saskatchewan on the Canada–US border. Montana Highway 13 on the American side joins Saskatchewan Highway 36 on the Canadian side. An airport with a grass runway that straddles the border is located on the east side of this crossing.

Canadian side
Formerly called "East Poplar River", the Coronach border station was established in 1914 under the administrative oversight of the Port of Moose Jaw. In 1917/18, a combined residence and customs office was erected. The Canadian border station was upgraded in 1958, 1981 and 2014.

US side

In 1924, a border patrol station was established as a sub-office with Plentywood Station. In 1937, an inspection station at the Canadian border was established. This facility was reconstructed in the late 1970s.  In 2007, a new facility was constructed that supports both CBP and Border Patrol.

In 2019, the new hours of 9am to 7pm year round were a reduction from 13 hours a day to 10.

Biometric System

In 1996, this border crossing became the world's first fully automated port of entry, using biometrics to confirm the identity of travelers. The US and Canadian governments engaged in a cooperative prototype project to enable certain trusted individuals with nothing to declare to cross the border in either direction after the port had closed for the night. Local residents who were enrolled could use a speaker recognition system to open the gates and enter the country without inspection. This system was replaced with a Remote Video Inspection System in 1998, which was decommissioned after the September 11 attacks of 2001.

See also 
 List of Canada–United States border crossings
 Coronach/Scobey Border Station Airport

References

Canada–United States border crossings
Geography of Saskatchewan
1924 establishments in Montana
1914 establishments in Saskatchewan